Papa Eftim IV (born Paşa Ümit Erenerol) is the fourth and incumbent patriarch of the Autocephalous Turkish Orthodox Patriarchate. He was given the title of Turkish Orthodox Patriarch of the Autocephalous Turkish Orthodox Patriarchate, an unrecognised Orthodox Christian denomination, with strong influences from Turkish nationalist ideology.

Papa Eftim IV was born as Paşa Ümit Erenerol. He is the grandson of Papa Eftim I and the son of Papa Eftim III. He became patriarch after Papa Eftim III resigned his position after political disagreements with the Turkish government over growing links between the Turkish state and the Greek Ecumenical Patriarch, and Turkish attempts to join the European Union; Papa Eftim III died a few weeks later.

Eftim IV took over office in 2002.

References

1960 births
Autocephalous Turkish Orthodox Patriarchate
Eastern Orthodox Christians from Turkey
Living people
Turkish nationalists